In free and open source software and inner source software, a software maintainer or package maintainer is usually one or more people who build source code into a binary package for distribution, commit patches, or organize code in a source repository. If the maintainer stops doing their work on the project, then the development of the project stops. If another person not associated with the maintainer releases a new version of the project, it is said that a fork has been created. So for example happened with uClibc.

Maintainers often cryptographically sign binaries so that people can verify their authenticity.

See also
Software maintenance
Software developer
Code review
List of software package management systems

References

Software maintenance

fi:Ylläpitäjä